Shoja (also Romanized as Shojā‘) is a village in Shoja Rural District of the Central District of Jolfa County, East Azerbaijan province, Iran. At the 2006 National Census, its population was 2,287 in 617 households. The following census in 2011 counted 2,297 people in 682 households. The latest census in 2016 showed a population of 2,538 people in 819 households; it was the largest village in its rural district.

References 

Jolfa County

Populated places in East Azerbaijan Province

Populated places in Jolfa County